Kirbyville Consolidated Independent School District is a public school district based in Kirbyville, Texas (USA).

Located in Jasper County, a small portion of the district extends into Newton County.

In 2009, the school district was rated "academically acceptable" by the Texas Education Agency.

Schools
Kirbyville High School (Grades 9-12)
Kirbyville Junior High School(Grades 7-8)
Kirbyville Elementary School(Grades PK-6)

References

External links
Kirbyville Consolidated ISD

School districts in Jasper County, Texas
School districts in Newton County, Texas